Kirk Reeves (1956–2012), also known as "Working" Kirk Reeves, was an American street musician and entertainer best known for playing a trumpet on the west bank bridgehead of the Hawthorne Bridge in Portland, Oregon while wearing a Mickey Mouse hat and a white suit.

Life and years as an entertainer 

Reeves was born in Boston, Massachusetts and later spent time "hanging around" a computer club at the Massachusetts Institute of Technology. This led to a job in Oregon in the computing industry that he later left over concerns that the Y2K bug would put him out of work.

He decided to pursue a career as an entertainer, purchased a trumpet at a garage sale and started taking lessons. In the early 2000s, Reeves became a common sight on the streets of downtown Portland, often performing across the street from Powell's City of Books. Reeves spent many of the following years homeless and bore a scar along his neck from a violent attack.

He also suffered from diabetes, cataracts and depression. Despite these ailments, he entertained thousands of Portland-area motorists, pedestrians and cyclists for over a decade with his music, magic tricks and a rolling cart filled with gadgets, puppets and other props. Reeves eventually relocated to a semi-permanent spot at the west end of the Hawthorne Bridge, where he often performed during his later years. His signature tunes included "Somewhere Over the Rainbow," the title theme from the Star Wars film series and "Amazing Grace."  
 
Reeves also wrote four unpublished novels and hosted a Portland-area cable access program  called Low Comedy.  In May 2012, he traveled to Los Angeles to audition for a slot on America's Got Talent and Shark Tank but wasn't selected for either program.

Death 
Despondent over his setbacks as an entertainer, financial troubles and his health problems, Reeves committed suicide over the weekend of November 3, 2012 in the Smith and Bybee Wetlands Natural Area in North Portland. 
On the night of November 18, 2012, a candlelight vigil attended by over 200 people was held for Reeves under the Hawthorne Bridge. Portland Mayor Sam Adams declared that Sunday "Kirk Reeves Day." A group of trumpeters played "Taps" and "Amazing Grace" as the assembly marched across the bridge.

A group called the Memorial for Kirk Reeves the Trumpet Man attempted to raise funds for the construction of a Reeves statue and hoped to have it placed near the Hawthorne Bridge. Their efforts subsequently transitioned into an unsuccessful campaign to name a new transit bridge (ultimately named Tilikum Crossing) for him.

References

External links 
 Kirk Reeves, In Memoriam

Musicians from Portland, Oregon
1956 births
2012 suicides
Musicians from Boston
American trumpeters
American male trumpeters
Suicides by firearm in Oregon